Clinacanthus is a genus of flowering plants belonging to the family Acanthaceae.

Its native range is Southern China to Wester. Malesia.

Species:

Clinacanthus nutans 
Clinacanthus robinsoni 
Clinacanthus siamensis 
Clinacanthus spirei

References

Acanthaceae
Acanthaceae genera